Tonite with HSY is a Pakistani prime time talk show hosted by Hassan Sheheryar Yasin (HSY) on Hum Sitaray. The show premiered on 13 September 2014. It is presented by Djuice and produced by Hum Television Network. Tonite with HSY represents the debut of its star, prominent fashion designer HSY, as a television host. Prior to the show, HSY had only made brief television appearances other than as a designer on fashion shows. The show's associate producers are Nida Lakhani and Sara Bhatti, of Hum TV, and its executive producers are Hum TV CEO Sultana Siddiqui and Hum Sitaray vice president Khalid Soorty. Tonite with HSY is recorded at  Hum TV Studio in I.I Chundrigar Road, Karachi.

Tonite with HSY opens with a monologue by HSY. It then transitions into guest introductions, concluding with guest interviews and fun interactive segments. The debut episode attracted positive reviews from television critics and was viewed by millions of people in Pakistan.

From Season 1-3, Hum Sitaray aired one episode a week, on Saturdays at 9:10 p.m Pakistan Standard Time (PST). Season 4 aired on Hum TV every Sunday at 10.20pm PST. Season 5 premiered on Hum TV on 15 July 2018, and was broadcast at 9.10pm every Sunday. The finale was scheduled to air on 7 October 2018, concluding the 13 episodes of Season 5. Tonite with HSY is aired in Europe at 9:00 pm on Hum Europe.

Season Overview

Season 1-5

Background
Talk shows in Pakistan focus mainly on news and current affairs. There are few late-night, prime time or daytime entertainment talk shows similar to those produced elsewhere in the world.

Tonite with HSY marks the television debut of its host, Hassan Sheheryar Yasin (HSY). HSY is one of Pakistan's most prominent fashion designers, with 20 years in the fashion industry. When the show premiered on 13 September 2014, HSY said in an interview: "I have been offered shows many times before but I never had the time...I love TV and everyone knows that I love talking, so it seemed like a great time to start this up."

According to HSY, the show was conceived as an escape from the daily hustle and bustle of life, offering a completely different platform for conversation between the host and guests. In an interview HSY said:

The show, intended as popular entertainment, was designed to air once a week, with a running time of around one hour or 40 minutes.

Format

Episodes of Tonite with HSY usually open with a brief introduction of the invited guests, followed by an initial conversation between the host and guests. After around fifteen minutes, the main part of the episode begins. Episodes are divided into three segments:

"Love 'em Hate 'em": the first segment, in which guests are shown a series of pictures of celebrities, and have five seconds to say for each whether they love or hate that person
"Ajnabi Kaun Ho Tum": the second segment, in which each guest receives an anonymous phone call from family, friends, or colleagues and must guess the caller's name
"Tarka": the third and final round, a Question and Answer session in which guests are given questions written on a card, and must take turns firing questions at each other

Episodes

Debut episode

The debut episode of Tonite with HSY premiered on 13 September 2014. It featured two of Pakistan's best-known faces, Mahira Khan and Fawad Khan.

In the episode, without introducing himself, HSY conducts a spontaneous interview with the guests before launching into the show's standard three-segment format. Mahira and Fawad are asked about their life, success, and achievements after their groundbreaking serial Humsafar. HSY then launches the show's three segments, running each with Mahira first and then Fawad. Mahira wins the game, taking the prize of a PKR 50,000 voucher/gift-hamper from the Contradictions furniture store.

See also
 TUC The Lighter Side of Life

References

External links
 
 
 
 Hum Sitaray live streaming

Hum Sitaray
Hum Network Limited
2014 Pakistani television series debuts
Urdu-language television shows
Variety television series